Omorinsola Omowunmi Ajike Babajide (born 17 June 1998), known as Rinsola Babajide, is an English professional footballer who plays as a winger for Spanish Liga F club Real Betis. She previously played for Millwall Lionesses and Watford Ladies Football Club, Brighton & Hove Albion and she has represented England at Under 21 level.

Babajide was Liverpool's second highest goal scorer in the 2018/19 WSL season with two campaign goals.

Babajide was then Liverpool's joint-second WSL goal scorer in the 2019/20 season with one single league goal. She didn't feature for Liverpool in the second half of the 2020/21 Championship season after refusing to train with the first team squad and was then subsequently moved down into the age group development squad away from the first team.

Club career

Millwall Lionesses
She joined Millwall Lionesses Ladies from Crystal Palace Ladies in January 2015, but made her professional debut on March 18 against the London Bees in a FA WSL match which ended in a draw.

Watford Ladies
In February 2017, Babajide completed a transfer to Watford Ladies. She scored her first competitive goal for the club in a 3–2 loss to London Bees in a FA WSL Spring Series fixture. Babajide finished as Watford's joint top scorer in the 2017 Spring Series, with three goals.

Liverpool Women
Her transfer to Liverpool was announced on 25 January 2018. Babajide was part of the squad that saw Liverpool relegated to the Championship in 2020.

Brighton & Hove Albion WFC

On 26 July 2021, Brighton & Hove Albion Women Football Club announced the signing of Rinsola on a season-long loan deal from Liverpool Women.

International career
In August 2018, Babajide was part of the England U20s squad that claimed bronze at the 2018 FIFA U-20 Women's World Cup. In September 2020 she was included in a training camp for the England women's national football team.

Due to her family background, Babajide is also eligible to represent Nigeria.

Career statistics

Club

Honours

England U20s
FIFA U-20 Women's World Cup third place: 2018
Individual

 Liverpool Women's Player of the Season Award (2019-20)

References

1998 births
Living people
Footballers from Greater London
English women's footballers
Women's association football forwards
Crystal Palace F.C. (Women) players
Millwall Lionesses L.F.C. players
Watford F.C. Women players
Liverpool F.C. Women players
Real Betis Féminas players
Women's Super League players
FA Women's National League players
Alumni of the University of East London
English expatriate women's footballers
English expatriate sportspeople in Spain
Expatriate women's footballers in Spain
English sportspeople of Nigerian descent
Black British sportswomen